Franz Mertens (20 March 1840 – 5 March 1927) (also known as Franciszek Mertens) was a Polish mathematician. He was born in Schroda in the Grand Duchy of Posen, Kingdom of Prussia (now Środa Wielkopolska, Poland) and died in Vienna, Austria.

The Mertens function M(x) is the sum function for the Möbius function, in the theory of arithmetic functions. The Mertens conjecture concerning its growth, conjecturing it bounded by x1/2, which would have implied the Riemann hypothesis, is now known to be false (Odlyzko and te Riele, 1985).  The Meissel–Mertens constant is analogous to the Euler–Mascheroni constant, but the harmonic series sum in its definition is only over the primes rather than over all integers and the logarithm is taken twice, not just once. Mertens's theorems are three 1874 results related to the density of prime numbers.

Erwin Schrödinger was taught calculus and algebra by Mertens.

His memory is honoured by the Franciszek Mertens Scholarship granted to those outstanding pupils of foreign secondary schools who wish to study at the Faculty of Mathematics and Computer Science of the Jagiellonian University in Kraków and were finalists of the national-level mathematics, or computer science olympiads, or they have participated in one of the following international olympiads: in mathematics (IMO), computer science (IOI), astronomy (IAO), physics (IPhO), linguistics (IOL), or they were participants of the European Girls' Mathematical Olympiad (EGMO).

See also
 Mertens's theorems
 Cauchy product

References

External links

 
 

1840 births
1927 deaths
People from Środa Wielkopolska
People from the Province of Posen
Polish mathematicians
Austro-Hungarian mathematicians
Austrian mathematicians
19th-century German mathematicians
20th-century German mathematicians
Humboldt University of Berlin alumni
Academic staff of Jagiellonian University
Academic staff of the University of Vienna
Number theorists